William Arthur Jones (September 7, 1844September 17, 1912) was a Welsh American immigrant, educator, businessman, and Republican politician.  He was the 27th Commissioner of Indian Affairs, serving in the administration of U.S. President William McKinley.  Earlier, he was mayor of Mineral Point, Wisconsin, and represented Iowa County for two terms in the Wisconsin State Assembly.

Biography
Jones was born on September 7, 1844, in South Wales. He moved to Iowa County, Wisconsin, in 1851 and settled in a Welsh immigrant community near Mineral Point.  He was educated in the common schools there, then graduated from the Platteville State Normal School—now the University of Wisconsin-Platteville.

He went on to become principal of the Mineral Point high school and was elected to two terms as county superintendent of schools, serving from 1877 to 1881.

He became involved in a banking interest with Alex Wilson, known as Wilson & Jones in 1881, and one of the founders of the Mineral Point Zinc Company in 1882.  He remained associated with the Zinc Company until his death.  He subsequently became cashier and vice president of the First National Bank of Mineral Point, and was associated with the bank until 1897.

During this time, he was also active with the Republican Party of Wisconsin and was elected mayor and municipal judge of Mineral Point in the April 1884 election.  He was elected to the Wisconsin State Assembly on the Republican ticket in 1894 and 1896.  After the conclusion of the regular session of the 1897 session, he was appointed commissioner of Indian Affairs by newly-inaugurated U.S. President William McKinley.

Jones served as commissioner through McKinley's assassination in 1901, and continued as commissioner under McKinley's successor, Theodore Roosevelt.  Jones resigned in July 1904 due to clashes over personnel with the Secretary of the Interior, Ethan A. Hitchcock, but continued in the office until the end of the year.

After returning to Wisconsin, Jones was general manager of the Mineral Point & Northern Railway, and later was president of the company.

He died at his home in Mineral Point on September 17, 1912.

Personal life and family
William A. Jones had at least two brothers.  He married Sarah Ansley on October 22, 1881.  He was survived by his wife and four children.

Electoral history

Wisconsin Assembly (1894, 1896)

| colspan="6" style="text-align:center;background-color: #e9e9e9;"| General Election, November 6, 1894 

| colspan="6" style="text-align:center;background-color: #e9e9e9;"| General Election, November 3, 1896

References

1844 births
1912 deaths
Welsh emigrants to the United States
People from Mineral Point, Wisconsin
Republican Party members of the Wisconsin State Assembly
Mayors of places in Wisconsin
Farmers from Wisconsin
University of Wisconsin–Platteville alumni
United States Bureau of Indian Affairs personnel
McKinley administration personnel
Theodore Roosevelt administration personnel